Yau Yue Commercial Bank was a bank in Hong Kong.

Background
The bank was founded in 1953. In the banking crisis of 1965, bank runs occurred in several small and medium-sized banks. In 1966, the British Hong Kong government asked The Hongkong and Shanghai Banking Corporation to take over the bank. The bank was bankrupted in 1969.

References

Banks established in 1953
Banks disestablished in 1969
Defunct banks of Hong Kong